Merle van Benthem (born 7 December 1992) is a Dutch BMX rider, representing her nation at international competitions. She competed in the time trial event and race event at the 2015 UCI BMX World Championships.

References

External links
 
 
 
 

1992 births
Living people
BMX riders
Dutch female cyclists
Olympic cyclists of the Netherlands
Cyclists at the 2016 Summer Olympics
European Games competitors for the Netherlands
Cyclists at the 2015 European Games
Sportspeople from Hengelo
Cyclists from Overijssel
Place of birth missing (living people)
21st-century Dutch women